The SIAI-Marchetti S.211 (later Aermacchi S-211) is a turbofan-powered military trainer aircraft designed and originally marketed by Italian aviation manufacturer SIAI-Marchetti.

SIAI-Marchetti started to develop the S-211 in 1976 as a private venture initiative, announcing its existence during the following year. On 10 April 1981, the first prototype performed its maiden flight. The Singapore Air Force placed the first order for ten aircraft in 1983. Some 60 aircraft have been sold to air forces around the world. Following Aermacchi's purchase of SIAI-Marchetti in 1997, the former has held the production rights to the type. An extensively redesigned and modernised derivative, the Aermacchi M-345, has been developed by Alenia Aermacchi, and is set to enter service during 2020.

Development
During 1976, Italian aircraft company SIAI-Marchetti commenced work on what would become the S-211; the project was undertaken as a private venture to develop a new basic trainer aircraft. SIAI-Marchetti planned to offer the type to the company's existing customer base, consisting of various air forces around the world that operated their SF.260, a  piston-engined trainer. The programme's existence was formally announced in Paris during 1977, reportedly, customer interest was strong enough to justify the construction of two prototypes, the first of which flew on 10 April 1981. During 1983, the Singapore Air Force placed the first order for the S-211, procuring a batch of ten aircraft.

The S-211A was a slightly modified and updated variant of the S-211, was a losing contender in the United States Air Force's Joint Primary Aircraft Training System (JPATS) aircraft selection. Among the seven aircraft to enter, the Raytheon/Pilatus entry emerged as the winner, being produced as the T-6 Texan II. The S-211 team was initially partnered with American aircraft company Grumman; following its merger with Northrop Corporation in 1994, SIAI-Marchetti worked with Northrop Grumman on the S-211A up until the selection.

During 1997, rival Italian aviation firm Aermacchi acquired SIAI-Marchetti and thereby the S-211; according to Aermacchi, the acquisition would enable significant cost savings in production following consolidation to its Venegono Inferiore facility. Aermacchi has continued to seek customers for the type. In 2004, the company announced its intention to develop an improved version of the S-211, then referred to as the S-311 (later as the M-345). At the time, Aermacchi was also developing the M-346 Master, which serves as a lead-in fighter trainer; while vaguely similar to the M-311, the latter is considerably smaller and intended to perform both the basic and advanced training syllabus, as well tactical training functions, as an alternative to single-engined turboprop-powered competitors.

Design

The S-211 is a compact two-seat shoulder-wing monoplane, possessing a full aerobatic capability. It is furnished with a retractable tricycle landing gear and is powered by a single Pratt & Whitney Canada JT15D-4C turbofan powerplant. The S-211 has been principally used as a basic trainer aircraft, the student and instructor being seated in a tandem arrangement; the front and rear cockpits are fully duplicated, the latter being elevated above the former to provide the occupant with improved forward visibility. Additionally, the aircraft was designed to perform a secondary close air support (CAS) capability, being equipped with four underwing hard points, facilitating the carriage of various armaments and other external stores, including sensor apparatus and photographic equipment for undertaking aerial reconnaissance missions. Some models feature an additional hard point on the underside of the fuselage.

The airframe is largely composed of several composite materials, which includes Kevlar, Nomex and carbon fibre, while extensive use of structural bonding was made during construction. The flight controls feature manually operated push-pull rod primary controls; many other systems, such as the air brake, landing gear, compressor, and boosted ailerons, are hydraulically-actuated at a nominal operating pressure of 200 bar (3,000 psi). The electrical system consists of a 28V DC supply, being powered by an engine-driven generator, an AC supply for instruments and avionics is provided via a pair of inverters; to facilitate engine start-up and accommodate emergency situations, the aircraft is outfitted with a nickel-cadmium battery unit. For greater crew comfort, an automatically adjusting environmental control system is installed; it uses a non-ozone-depleting vapour cycle for cooling, which is combined with bleed air drawn from the engine for heat and pressurisation alike.

The avionics of the S-211 were designed to be customisable, allowing the manufacturer to accommodate a customer's various mission requirements. In a typical configuration, the aircraft would be provided a VHF/UHF communications suite, multiple navigation systems, such as an attitude and heading reference system (AHRS), horizontal situation indicator, automatic direction finding (ADF), VHF omnidirectional range and instrument landing system (VOR-ILS), a tactical air navigation system (TACAN) and identification friend or foe (IFF) transponder. Operators can choose to have their S-211s outfitted with modern glass cockpits.

The S-211's single JTI5D-4C engine provides a maximum thrust output of 11.12 kN (2,500 lbs) and a specific fuel consumption of 0.57 lb/h/lb. This powerplant facilitates a maximum speed of 414 knots at 25,000 ft and a rate of climb of 5,100 ft per minute. Fuel is housed internally within both the integral wing tank and a bladder cell within the fuselage, accommodating a combined 955 L (210 U.S. gal); for greater range, a maximum of two drop tanks can be installed upon the inner hard points of the wing, each having a capacity of 323 L (71 U.S. gal). Fuel is transferred between the various tanks and to the engine via a double-ended turbine pump. Ground refuelling involves a single fill point present on the wing, which is fed either by gravity flow or by an optionally installed pressurised refuelling system.

Operational history

Since the 1990s, the Philippine Air Force (PAF) has been using its S-211 fleet both as a trainer and in offensive operations via secondary attack capability. These were redesignated as AS-211s and nicknamed as "Warriors". Following the retirement of the PAF's last Northrop F-5 fighters in 2005, the additional task of air defense has also been assigned to its AS-211s. Because of this, the PAF initiated some improvements to the AS-211s to improve its combat capability through a series of programs and innovations.

The first program was called "Project Falcon", which installed the Norsight Optical Sight previously fitted to withdrawn F-5s into the AS-211. The program was initiated by Lieutenant Colonel Enrique Dela Cruz, the Group Commander of the 5th Tactical Fighter Group. This was followed by the "Project Falcon Uniform" program, which repainted the aircraft with a 2-tone light-and-dark ghost gray paint scheme along with low visibility markings, which reduces the aircraft's overall visibility.

The "Project Falcon Hear" program involved the optimizing of air-ground communications on the AS-211 by upgrading and installing the AN/ARC-34 UHF radios from the F-5A/B. These aircraft were also fitted with a belly-mounted gun pod, which was designed, developed and manufactured by Philippine company Aerotech Industries Philippines, Inc. (AIPI). Each gun pod is equipped with an M3 .50 cal machine gun, an automatic charger and approximately 240 rounds of .50 cal ammunition.

Variants
S-211 Original production version with total of approximately sixty built and was operated by the air forces of Haiti, Philippines and Singapore.
S-211A Proposed version developed with input from Grumman for the JPATS (two prototypes, converted from two former Haitian S-211 aircraft).
AS-211 Served as trainers with secondary combat capability with the Philippine Air Force and were nicknamed as "Warriors". Starting in 2005, these aircraft were upgraded by fitting the Norsight Optical Sight and AN/ARC-34s  from retired F-5s.  It is also equipped with a .50 caliber belly gun pod made by Aerotech.
M-311 Modernized and uprated version announced by Aermacchi in 2004 (two prototypes built).

Operators

Military operators

Haitian Air Force (HAF) – Four aircraft were delivered in June 1985, they were retired and put up for sale on 23 April 1990.

Philippine Air Force (PAF) – 25 aircraft, including one partially completed airframe for spare parts and 15 assembled locally by Philippine Aerospace Development Corporation. Due to accidents, 13 remain in inventory, 5 in active service as of September 2013 (Tail numbers 001,002,021,801 and 802). Another aircraft with tail number 008 is planned to be overhauled and brought back to service in 2014.
105th Training Squadron "Blackjacks", 5th Fighter Wing
7th Tactical Fighter Squadron "Bulldogs" replaced by KAI FA-50PH Fighting Eagle 2015-2017

Republic of Singapore Air Force (RSAF) – total of 32 aircraft including 24 assembled locally by Singapore Aircraft Industries and two former Haitian aircraft were acquired as attrition replacements. The aircraft were based in, and flight training undertaken, in Australia.
130 Squadron, Republic of Singapore Air Force – 25 airframes in operational use (7 airframes were write-offs due to accidents). These were replaced by the Pilatus PC-21 from end 2008. After retirement, four were shipped back to Singapore being preserved for museum display and as educational/instructional airframes, while the remaining 21 airframes (including one airframe that had been used for spare parts) were sold off to International Air Parts (IAP) Group Australia Pty Ltd in 2009.
131 Sqn – disbanded in 1996, following the move of RSAF Flight Training School to RAAF Base Pearce in Bullsbrook, Western Australia, all remaining aircraft transferred to the former.

Civilian operators

21 ex-RSAF S-211s were retired and sold to the IAP Group Australia in December 2009 (including a cannibalised airframe), fifteen have since been sold off and placed on the Australian civil registry.

Two second-hand aircraft (ex-Haitian AF) are operated by private companies.
Aviation Performance Solutions uses S211 SIAI-Marchettis at their headquarters in Mesa, Arizona.

Accidents and incidents
 On 14 January 2002, Philippine Air Force S-211 #017 crashed into houses inside the National Food Authority compound in Brgy. M.S.Garcia, Cabanatuan City, Nueva Ecija, due to mechanical problems after making several low passes over Cabanatuan during a contact proficiency flight from Basa AB. Both pilots and 3 civilians on the ground were killed.
 On 26 November 2007, Philippine Air Force S-211 #804 went missing after it failed to return to Palawan base after a security patrol and search mission over the disputed Kalayaan Islands in the south China sea, both pilots still missing and their fate remains unknown.
 On July 19, 2010, Philippine Air Force S-211 #024 crashed in Concepcion, Tarlac. The 2 pilots, Maj. Wilfredo Donato and 1Lt. Jose Wilbert Leonides Martinez, ejected and landed safely. The aircraft was reportedly low on fuel, which could have caused the crash.
 On 28 April 2011, Philippine Air Force S-211 #020 crashed in Bagac, Bataan, after making several aerobatic maneuvers over the shoreline during a contact proficiency flight from Clark Air Base. Investigators later found out that the aircraft entered into a high-G recovery maneuver from a loop that caused the engine to go into a high-G stall and crashed less than a hundred meters from the shoreline with no survivors.

Aircraft on display

 S-211 (9V-341), instructional airframe at Temasek Polytechnic.
 S-211 (9V-343), instructional airframe at ITE College Central (Ang Mo Kio campus).
S-211 (9V-383), instructional airframe at Paya Lebar Air Base.
S-211 (9V-384), gate guard at RSAF Museum.
S-211 ('I-SITF', s/n 001) - first prototype, in white/green colour scheme. Parked outdoors at Volandia Museum, Malpensa, Italy.
S-211 ('I-SIJF', s/n 002) - second prototype, in brown/tan colour scheme. Parked indoors at Volandia Museum, Malpensa, Italy.
S-211 ('I-SMTE', s/n 021) - in blue/white colour scheme, with JPATS titles. On a pole as gate guard at Volandia Museum parking, Malpensa, Italy.

Specifications (S-211)

See also

References

Citations

Bibliography

External links

 Unofficial S-211 site
 Republic of Singapore Air Force Trainer Factsheet
 S211A Jet Trainer, Italy
 Spherical panoramas inside the cockpits of two S.211s with digital and analog avionics display

1980s Italian military trainer aircraft
S-211
S-211
Single-engined jet aircraft
Shoulder-wing aircraft
Aircraft first flown in 1981